Erwin Lamond Dudley (born October 2, 1981) is an American professional basketball player for Sakarya BB of the Turkish Basketball Super League (BSL). He also holds Turkish citizenship, under the name of Ersin Dağlı.

College career
Born in Uniontown, Alabama, Dudley is a graduate of the University of Alabama in Tuscaloosa. While at the Capstone, he consistently made a name for himself. During his college basketball career, Dudley was named an All-American by the Associated Press, a consensus Southeastern Conference 2002 Player of the Year and a unanimous All-SEC First Team pick.

Dudley led the Southeastern Conference in rebounding for three consecutive seasons, becoming the first to do so since Shaquille O'Neal. He also holds the University's school record with 129 career starts and ranks seventh all-time in scoring (1,764 points) and fourth in rebounding (1,184). Dudley also recorded 43 double-doubles, giving him the nickname “E-double double”.

Professional career
He missed the 2003–2004 season due to a knee injury. He would have played for Basket Rimini Crabs in Italy.

In 2004, Dudley started his professional career with Maccabi Rishon LeZion in Israel starting in 22 games, averaging 19.7 points and 11.6 rebounds.

In 2005, he joined Türk Telekom in Ankara, Turkey, where he averaged 17.1 points and 8.4 rebounds in 34 games. In 2006, Dudley re-signed with Türk Telekom, where he averaged 16.1 points, 8.8 rebounds and 1.4 assists in the Turkish Basketball League and 21.4 points, 6.8 rebounds, 1.2 assists in Fiba EuroCup. After playing five seasons with Türk Telekom, Dudley's contract came to an end. In the summer of 2010, he signed a contract with Efes Pilsen.

In the summer of 2011, he signed a contract with Beşiktaş. He helped them to win the Turkish Basketball League, Turkish Cup and EuroChallenge. In July 2012, he signed a contract with Galatasaray Liv Hospital. In July 2014, he signed a contract with Turkish team Darüşşafaka.

On November 16, 2017, he signed with Sakarya BB for the rest of the 2017–18 BSL season.

Personal
Dudley is the son of Patricia Dudley and Otis Hunter II. He has a daughter, LaDaisha. In August 2011, he welcomed twins. Due to playing with Türk Telekom for three consecutive seasons, Dudley was eligible to apply for Turkish citizenship. On December 17, 2008, his Turkish citizenship became official. The 2009–10 basketball season was his first playing as a Turkish citizen.  Dudley currently maintains dual American and Turkish citizenship.

References

External links
 Erwin Dudley at eurobasket.com
 Erwin Dudley at euroleague.net
 Erwin Dudley at tblstat.net

1981 births
Living people
African-American basketball players
Alabama Crimson Tide men's basketball players
All-American college men's basketball players
American emigrants to Turkey
American expatriate basketball people in Israel
American expatriate basketball people in Turkey 
American men's basketball players
Anadolu Efes S.K. players
Basketball players from Alabama
Beşiktaş men's basketball players
Darüşşafaka Basketbol players
Galatasaray S.K. (men's basketball) players
Israeli Basketball Premier League players
Maccabi Rishon LeZion basketball players
Naturalized citizens of Turkey
People from Uniontown, Alabama
Power forwards (basketball)
Sakarya BB players
Turkish men's basketball players
Turkish people of African-American descent
Türk Telekom B.K. players
21st-century African-American sportspeople
20th-century African-American people